Atia Islam Anne is a Bangladeshi artist known for her work on women's regrets, needs, despair and frustration and, more broadly, violence against women. Along with artists like Dilara Begum Jolly, Kanak Chanpa Chakma, and Fareha Zeba, Anne is part of a movement of women artists whose feminist work became more popular during the 1990s in Bangladesh.

Biography

Education 
In 1982 Anne received a BFA in Drawing and Painting from Institute of Fine Arts, University of Dhaka, Bangladesh, and in 1985 received an MFA in Drawing and Painting at the same university.

Career

Major themes
Atia Islam Anne's work has been cited as "testament to a newly awakening consciousness among the female artists of Bangladesh", particularly her "Women and Society" series as a satire on the dominant, male myth and simultaneously an attack on the patriarchal system, in which women are viewed solely as sex objects.

Atia Islam Anne's works are surrealistic and have a touch of fantasy, tinged with irony and humour. Her work highlights the tragic conditions brought on by misrule and abuse of power, with a clear message of social criticism running throughout.

Selected exhibitions

Between 1981 and 2009, Anne's work was included in over 60 group shows in China, USA, India, UK, France, Myanmar and Bangladesh.

In 2009, she held a solo exhibition entitled Inauspicious Time, at the Bengal Gallery of Fine Arts, described as " a satire on the dominant male myth and an attack on the hollowness of the patriarchal system where women are always sex objects."

Notes/Further reading
 Atia Islam Anne, Biography

See also

Women Artists of Bangladesh

References

Living people
Bangladeshi women painters
1962 births
21st-century women artists